The Bay'ah Mosque, also known as the Mosque of 'Aqaba Hill, is a mosque outside Mecca in Saudi Arabia. It was built at the request of Caliph Abu Ja'far al-Mansur in 761/2 at the site of al-Bay'ah, i.e. the place where the Islamic Prophet Muhammad met with the Ansar (the supporters), and they took the pledge ('bay'ah', hence the name) of 'Aqaba.

The mosque has an open courtyard. It is located below the Wadi Mina, 300 meters from the jamrah al-'aqaba (see Stoning of the Devil), to the right of the bridge.

See also

 Islam in Saudi Arabia
 List of mosques in Saudi Arabia

Mosques in Mecca